Clifford Leon "Andy" Anderson (30 January 1951 – 26 February 2019) was a British drummer, best known for his work with The Cure and Steve Hillage.

Life and work
Anderson worked on Xitintoday, a studio album released by former Hawkwind member Nik Turner's project Sphynx in 1978, which was produced by Steve Hillage. He then joined Hillage's band and appeared on his two 1979 albums, Live Herald and Open. After a few years as a session musician, he had a brief stint in Hawkwind in 1983, but did not record with them.

His tenure in that band was cut short when he played with the Glove on their first and only album Blue Sunshine. This led to him joining the Cure later that year, when original drummer Lol Tolhurst moved to keyboards.  Anderson recorded on the albums Japanese Whispers, The Top, and Concert in addition to the singles "Love Cats" and "The Caterpillar".

He is credited on recordings by many other bands and artists, including (in order of release) Techno Twins, M/Robin Scott, Jimmy Pursey, Mother Gong, Jeffrey Lee Pierce, Steve Vengeance, Two-Bit Thief, The Saints, Backbeats, Martha Munizzi, Group 1 Crew, the Gun Club, Spirits Burning & Clearlight, and Beat the System (as a producer).

He also collaborated with many other artists including Brilliant, the Edgar Broughton Band, the Burning Sensations, Circus Hazzard, Edwyn Collins, the Cureheads, Hooky Dallion, Jason Donovan, Peter Gabriel, Mick Hawksworth and Friends, Isaac Hayes, Iggy Pop, The Last Poets, Lol Tolhurst's Levinhurst, Glenn Matlock, Steve New, Nik Turner's Inner City Unit, Mike Oldfield, David Michael Phillips, Pink Flamingos , Jimmy Somerville, Midge Ure, Jenn Vix, Harry Williamson and Friends, Youth, and Zeke Manyika's Dr. Love.

As well as being a session musician, Anderson was a producer of television commercials and worked for record companies and charities.

He posted newly recorded solo tracks on YouTube as Front & Centre.

Anderson was diagnosed with terminal cancer in February 2019 and died on 26 February 2019, aged 68.

Partial discography
Nik Turner's Sphynx
Xitintoday (1978)

Steve Hillage 
Live Herald (1979)
Open (1979)
Green (2007 Edition) Plays on 2 of the 4 Bonus songs.

The Glove
 Blue Sunshine (1983)

The Cure
 Japanese Whispers (1983)
 The Top (1984)
 Concert (1984)
 The Cure Live In Japan (1984) VHS
 Standing on a Beach (1986)
 Greatest Hits (2001)

References

1951 births
2019 deaths
Deaths from cancer in the United Kingdom
Hawkwind members
People from West Ham
The Cure members
The Glove members
Black British rock musicians
New wave drummers